The Niagara River is a river that flows north from Lake Erie to Lake Ontario. It forms part of the border between the province of Ontario in Canada (on the west) and the state of New York in the United States (on the east). There are differing theories as to the origin of the river's name. According to Iroquoian scholar Bruce Trigger, Niagara is derived from the name given to a branch of the locally residing native Neutral Confederacy, who are described as being called the Niagagarega people on several late-17th-century French maps of the area. According to George R. Stewart, it comes from the name of an Iroquois town called Ongniaahra, meaning "point of land cut in two".

Today, the diversion of the river for electrical generation has significantly reduced the rate of erosion. The Niagara Gorge extends downstream from the Falls and includes the Niagara Whirlpool and another section of rapids.

Power plants on the river include the Sir Adam Beck Hydroelectric Power Stations (built in 1922 and 1954) on the Canadian side, and the Robert Moses Niagara Power Plant (built in 1961) on the American side. Together, they generate 4.4 gigawatts of electricity. The International Control Works, built in 1954, regulates the river flow. Ships on the Great Lakes use the Welland Canal, part of the Saint Lawrence Seaway, on the Canadian side of the river, to bypass Niagara Falls.

The Niagara River also features two large islands and numerous smaller islands.  Grand Island and Navy Island, the two largest islands, are on the American and Canadian sides of the river, respectively.  Goat Island and the tiny Luna Island split Niagara Falls into its three sections, the Horseshoe Falls, Bridal Veil Falls, and American Falls. Unity Island lies further upstream, alongside the city of Buffalo.

The Niagara River and its tributaries, Tonawanda Creek and the Welland River, formed part of the last section of the Erie Canal and Welland Canal. After leaving Lockport, New York, the Erie Canal proceeds southwest until it enters Tonawanda Creek. After entering the Niagara River, watercraft then proceed southward to the final lock, where a short section of the canal allows boats to avoid the turbulent shoal water at the river intake and enter Lake Erie. The Welland Canals used the Welland River as a connection to the Niagara River south of the falls, allowing water traffic to safely re-enter the Niagara River and proceed to Lake Erie.

History

The Niagara River and Falls have been known outside of North America since the late 17th century, when Father Louis Hennepin, a French explorer, first witnessed them. He wrote about his travels in A New Discovery of a Vast Country in America (1698).

The Niagara River was the site of the earliest recorded railway in America. It was an inclined wooden tramway built by John Montresor (1736–1799), a British military engineer, in 1764.  Called "The Cradles" and "The Old Lewiston Incline," it featured loaded carts pulled up wooden rails by rope. It facilitated the movement of goods over the Niagara Escarpment in present-day Lewiston, New York.

In 1781, the Niagara Purchase was signed, involving a  strip of land bordering the west bank of the Niagara River, connecting Lake Erie and Lake Ontario.

Several battles occurred along the Niagara River, which was historically defended by Fort George (Canadian side) and Fort Niagara (American side) at the mouth of the river and Fort Erie (Canadian side) at the head of the river. These forts were important during the Seven Years' War (known as the French and Indian War in the United States) and the American Revolutionary War. The Battle of Queenston Heights took place near the river in the War of 1812.

The river was an important route to liberation before the American Civil War, when many African-Americans escaping slavery on the Underground Railroad crossed it to find freedom in Canada. The Freedom Crossing Monument stands on the bank of the river in Lewiston to commemorate the courage of the escaping slaves and the local volunteers who helped them secretly cross the river.

In the 1880s, the Niagara River became the first waterway in North America harnessed for large-scale generation of hydroelectricity.

On the Canadian side of the river the provincial agency Niagara Parks Commission maintains all of the shoreline property, including Fort Erie, except the sites of Fort George (a National Historic Site maintained federally by Parks Canada), as a public greenspace and environmental heritage.

On the American side, the New York State Office of Parks, Recreation and Historic Preservation maintains several state parks adjacent to Niagara Falls and the Niagara River.

Today, the river is the namesake of Niagara Herald Extraordinary at the Canadian Heraldic Authority.

Cities and settlements

Cities and towns along the Niagara River include:

Pollution
The Niagara River is listed as a Great Lakes Areas of Concern in The Great Lakes Water Quality Agreement between the United States and Canada.

Crossings

The Niagara River has a long history of both road and rail bridges spanning the river, both upstream and downstream of the Falls. This history includes numerous bridges that have fallen victim to the harsh conditions of the Niagara Gorge, such as landslides and icepacks.

Parks

The following parks are located along the Niagara River:

A Niagara River Greenway Plan is in progress in the United States.

Hydrologic features

Islands
Several islands are located on the upper river upriver from the falls:

Military posts

United States Coast Guard Fort Niagara Station was once a United States Army post. There are no Canadian Coast Guard posts along the river. Fort Mississauga, Fort George and Fort Erie are former British and Canadian military forts (last used 1953, 1965 and 1923 respectively) and are now parks. 

Navy Island Royal Naval  Shipyard was used by the French Navy in the 18th century as a naval base and by the Royal Navy from 1763 as a small shipyard, and abandoned around 1818 after the ratification of the Rush–Bagot Treaty in 1817.

Roads

On the Canadian side the Niagara Parkway travels along the River from Lake Ontario to Lake Erie.

 lines the river on the state side from Fort Niagara to Lewiston.  on the state side only travels along the River from the Falls to Lewiston.

See also
List of international border rivers
List of New York rivers
List of Ontario rivers
Whirlpool Aero Car

References

 Tiplin, Albert H.; Seibel, George A. and Seibel, Olive M. (1988) Our romantic Niagara: a geological history of the river and the falls Niagara Falls Heritage Foundation, Niagara Falls, Ontario, Canada,

Further reading
 Hulbert, A. B. (1908). The Niagara River. New York: G.P. Putnam's Sons.

External links

 Views of the Niagara River Niagara Falls Public Library (Ontario)
 Digital Images of the Islands of the Niagara River Niagara Falls Public Library (Ontario)
 Buffalo Niagara Riverkeeper
 Niagara Falls The Islands A History of the Niagara River Islands
 "Niagara River" from The Canadian Encyclopedia.

 
International rivers of North America
Rivers of New York (state)
Rivers of the Regional Municipality of Niagara
Canada–United States border
Border rivers

Rivers of Niagara County, New York
Rivers of Erie County, New York
Saint Lawrence Seaway
Ramsar sites in the United States
New York placenames of Native American origin